Ambleside is a town in Cumbria, England, UK.

Ambleside may also refer to:

 Ambleside, Edmonton, a neighbourhood in Edmonton, Alberta, Canada
 Hahndorf, South Australia, a town in South Australia, named Ambleside from 1918 to 1935 
 Ambleside, West Vancouver, a neighbourhood in West Vancouver, British Columbia, Canada
 Ambleside railway station, a railway station in Balhannah, South Australia, Australia

See also
 CSI:Ambleside, an album by UK rock band Half Man Half Biscuit